Darling Mine is a 1920 American silent drama film directed by Laurence Trimble and starring Olive Thomas,  Walter McGrail and Walt Whitman.

Cast
 Olive Thomas as 	Kitty McCarthy
 Walter McGrail as Roger Davis
 Walt Whitman as 	James McCarthy
 J. Barney Sherry as Gordon Davis 
 Margaret McWade as	Agnes McCarthy
 Betty Schade as Vera Maxwell
 Richard Tucker as Jay Savoy

References

Bibliography
 Connelly, Robert B. The Silents: Silent Feature Films, 1910-36, Volume 40, Issue 2. December Press, 1998.
 Munden, Kenneth White. The American Film Institute Catalog of Motion Pictures Produced in the United States, Part 1. University of California Press, 1997.

External links
 

1920 films
1920 drama films
1920s English-language films
American silent feature films
Silent American drama films
American black-and-white films
Films directed by Laurence Trimble
Selznick Pictures films
1920s American films